John Scott Lennox Gilmour VMH FLS (28 September 1906 – 3 June 1986) was a British botanist, curator of the Cambridge University Herbarium, and later director of Cambridge University Botanic Garden and  Fellow of Clare College, Cambridge.

Life 

John Gilmour was born in London and educated at Downs School, Malvern, Uppingham School, Rutland and Clare College, Cambridge. From 1930 to 1931 he was Curator of the Herbarium and Botanical Museum, Botany School, Cambridge University, from 1931 to 1946 Assistant Director, Royal Botanic Gardens, Kew, from 1946 to 1951  Director, Royal Horticultural Society, Wisley and from 1951 to 1973 Director, Cambridge University Botanic Garden. From 1946 to 1979 he was also editor of the New Naturalist. John, a declared atheist, teamed up with Fr Maycock of Little Saint Mary's to help found the Cambridge Cyrenians, dealing with the homeless.  He died in 1986, at the age of 79.

Cambridge 1951–1973 
On returning to Cambridge, Gilmour succeeded Humphrey Gilbert-Carter as director in 1951, he was an important force in the development of the Eastern Garden, once the Cory Fund monies became available, and the Cory Laboratory and glasshouses were constructed in 1957. His scientific contributions were largely in the field of systematics and horticulture, playing an important role in the Systematics Association. When he retired in 1973 he was succeeded by Max Walters.

Awards 

In 1957 he was awarded the Royal Horticultural Society's Victoria Medal of Honour and in 1966 their Veitch Memorial Medal.

Selected publications

 Gilmour, J. and S. M. Walters, (1954) Wild Flowers, Botanising Britain, Collins
 Gilmour, J. and S. M. Walters, (1955) New Naturalist No 5, Wild Flowers, Collins

References

Bibliography 

 
 
 
 

1906 births
1986 deaths
People educated at Uppingham School
Fellows of Clare College, Cambridge
20th-century British botanists
New Naturalist writers
Veitch Memorial Medal recipients
Victoria Medal of Honour recipients